The Journal of Health Management is a quarterly peer-reviewed forum for discussion on major issues of health policy and health management in developing countries with a view to assisting the better implementation of desired changes.

The Journal is published by SAGE Publications, India in association with the Indian Institute of Health Management Research.

The journal is a member of the Committee on Publication Ethics (COPE).

Abstracting and indexing 
Journal of Health Management is abstracted and indexed in:
 SCOPUS
 ProQuest Science Journals
 DeepDyve
 Portico
 Dutch-KB
 EBSCO
 OCLC
 Ohio
 ICI
 ProQuest-Illustrata
 Illustrata: Natural Sciences
 ProQuest Technology Information
 ProQuest Health
 ProQuest Nursing
 J-Gate

External links 
 
 Homepage

References 

 COPE
 http://jhm.iihmr.edu.in/

SAGE Publishing academic journals
Publications established in 1990
Business and management journals
Public health journals